Carex sadoensis is a tussock-forming species of perennial sedge in the family Cyperaceae. It is native to Sakhalin, Japan and eastern parts of China.

See also
List of Carex species

References

sadoensis
Taxa named by Adrien René Franchet
Plants described in 1895
Flora of China
Flora of Japan
Flora of the Kuril Islands
Flora of Sakhalin